Snow Dogs is a 2002 American adventure comedy film directed by Brian Levant, and produced by Jordan Kerner. The film stars Cuba Gooding Jr., with a supporting cast of James Coburn (in one of his final film roles), Joanna Bacalso, Sisqó, Nichelle Nichols, Christopher Judge, Michael Bolton and M. Emmet Walsh. The film was released in the United States on January 18, 2002, by Walt Disney Pictures. The film is inspired by the book, Winterdance, by Gary Paulsen.

Plot
 
Dr. Theodore "Ted" Brooks (Gooding) is a celebrity dentist in Miami, Florida. Every city bus carries an advertisement for his dental practice "Hot Smile" with his picture. One day, Ted receives a letter from Alaska, naming him as the only heir of Lucy Watkins, a resident of the backwoods village of Tolketna. Ted's mother Amelia (Nichelle Nichols) reveals that he was adopted; Lucy was his biological mother.

Ted travels to Tolketna to claim his inheritance from Lucy: seven Siberian Huskies named Diesel, Mack, Sniff, Yodel, Scooper, Duchess and Demon, and a Border Collie named Nana. Completely out of his element, Ted is confounded by blizzards, thin ice, foxes, skunks, grizzly bears, an intimidating, crusty old mountain man named James "Thunder Jack" Johnson (Coburn), and the aggressive, defiant lead dog, Demon. All of this happens with the buzzing excitement of the Arctic Challenge Sled Dog Race, which is only two weeks away.

Ted tries to find out why he was placed for adoption, and who was his biological father. He meets bar owner Barb (Joanna Bacalso), a close friend of Lucy. Barb helps Ted to deal with the dogs and teaches him how to drive a sled, and the two fall in love. Ted has several encounters with Thunder Jack, who tries to buy the dogs, especially Demon. Barb reveals to Ted that Thunder Jack is his biological father. Ted confronts Jack, who initially denies the claims.

When Ted loses consciousness while practicing sledding and being chased by a bear, Jack rescues him and takes him to a cave. Jack offers to reveal the truth in exchange for the dogs; Ted agrees. Jack claims that he and Lucy hid from a storm in the same cave during an Arctic Challenge, and it was then that Ted was conceived. When Jack woke up, Lucy was gone. He looked for her but never found her.

Ted lets Jack have the dogs and returns to Miami. Jack adds Demon as lead dog of his team for the Arctic Challenge. When the race begins, Jack decides to press on in the middle of a fierce storm.

In Miami, Ted recounts his experiences to his mother, who accidentally breaks a frame holding a picture of Lucy and Demon. Inside of the frame is a snapshot of Lucy and Jack with a baby. Ted is infuriated that Jack lied to him, and rushes back to Alaska. He learns that Jack has gone missing and the weather is too bad for searching. Ted decides to search for Jack himself, taking Lucy's dogs with Nana as lead. A few hours later, Amelia arrives and meets Barb. She learns that Ted is out on the trail, searching for Jack. The "Arctic Flame" is burning over the finish line, until the last musher arrives.

Ted eventually locates Jack in the old cave. Jack admits he and Lucy had been together at the hospital when Ted was born, and that he loved her very much; but that he and Lucy had agreed then that neither one of them were ready to be parents. Ted also discovers that Demon's bad temper is due to a rotten tooth. He pulls the tooth, and Demon becomes a much friendlier dog. During the journey back to Tolketna, the sled nearly goes over a cliff into a river, but the dogs pull themselves back up. Ted finally brings Thunder Jack across the finish line. Ted introduces Jack to Amelia, and he and Jack decide to share the "Arctic Flame" trophy, which is given to whoever comes in last.

Some time later, Ted has moved his dental practice to Tolketna. He and Barb have married, and Barb is now his receptionist and pregnant, while Nana and Demon have four puppies. Back in Miami, Ted's cousin Rupert (Sisqó), also a dentist, becomes the new celebrity dentist, now with his face on every city bus.

Cast
 Cuba Gooding Jr. as Dr. Theodore "Ted" Brooks (a.k.a. "Teddy Bear"), a Miami dentist who goes to Alaska to find his origins and encounters a pack of sled dogs
 Jascha Washington as Young Ted
 Joanna Bacalso as Barb, a local Tolketna bar owner, and Ted's love interest
 James Coburn as James "Thunder Jack" Johnson, a mountain man and Ted's biological father
 Sisqó as Dr. Rupert Brooks, Ted's adopted cousin
 Nichelle Nichols as Amelia Brooks, Ted's adoptive mother
 Christopher Judge as Dr. Brooks, Ted's adoptive father
 Michael Bolton as himself, who appears in Ted's dream giving him advice that he still has soul
 M. Emmet Walsh as George Murphy
 Brian Doyle-Murray as Ernie
 Graham Greene as Peter Yellowbear
 Frank C. Turner as Neely
 Alison Matthews as TV Reporter
 Danelle Folta as Rollerblader with Dog
 Angela Moore as Lucy 
 Lossen Chambers as Receptionist
 Jim Belushi as the voice of Demon
 Jane Sibbett as the voice of Nana
 Frank Welker as the voice of Grizzly Bear, who encounters Ted and chases him through the mountain.
 Richard Steven Horvitz as the voice of Scooper (uncredited)
In some scenes, the faces of the dogs are partially animated to give them human expressions like winking or smiling. The animatronic version of Demon was created by Jim Henson's Creature Shop and performed by David Barclay.

Production
The film's budget was US$33 million. Canmore, Alberta, Canada was used to film the fictional city of Tolketna, Alaska. The dogs D.J., Koda, Floyd and Buck also starred in the later Disney live-action adventure film, Eight Below. Many of the dogs and mushers used in the film were locals. Two of the hero team doubles and all of Olivier's team were supplied by Nakitsilik Siberians of Bridge Lake, British Columbia. Mountain Mushers' from Golden BC supplied the Thunder Jack team.

Old Ernie's team was supplied by Russ Gregory from Calgary, Alberta, Canada. Arcticsun Siberian Husky Kennel from Edmonton, Alberta was one of many kennels — including Czyz, Snowy Owl, Gatt racing — from the area that supplied background for the film. Two of the dogs came from Kortar Kennels, in Ontario. The animatronic effects were designed and built by Jim Henson's Creature Shop.

The special effects were provided by The Secret Lab, the special effects division of Disney.

Reception
On Rotten Tomatoes, the film has an approval rating of 25% and an average rating of 4/10 based on 84 reviews. The site's consensus reads "A mediocre live action children's movie, Snow Dogs is filled with clichéd dialogue, tiresome pratfalls, and stale fish-out-of-water jokes." At Metacritic, which uses a weighted average, the film received a score of 29 out of 100 based on 26 critics, indicating "generally negative reviews". Audiences polled by CinemaScore gave the film an average grade of "A-" on an A+ to F scale.

It grossed $115 million worldwide against a $33 million budget. The film was released in the United Kingdom on May 31, 2002, and opened on #5.

Awards
John Debney won the ASCAP Award in 2003, for the soundtrack.

See also
Eight Below 
Snow Buddies
Nankyoku Monogatari

References

External links

 
 
 
 
 
 

2002 films
2002 comedy films
2000s adventure comedy films
American adventure comedy films
American children's adventure films
American children's comedy films
African-American films
Films about adoption
Films about dentistry
Films about dogs
Films based on non-fiction books
Films directed by Brian Levant
Films scored by John Debney
Films set in Alaska
Films set in Alberta
Films set in Miami
Films set in 1977
Films set in 2002
Films with screenplays by Tommy Swerdlow
Mushing films
Northern (genre) films
Walt Disney Pictures films
2000s English-language films
2000s American films